Olga may refer to:

People and fictional characters
 Olga (name), a given name, including a list of people and fictional characters named Olga or Olha
 Michael Algar (born 1962), English singer also known as "Olga"

Places

Russia
 Olga, Russia, an urban-type settlement in Primorsky Krai
 Olga Bay, a bay of the Sea of Japan in Primorsky Krai
 Olga (river), Primorsky Krai

United States
 Olga, Florida, an unincorporated community and census-designated place
 Olga, Kentucky, an unincorporated community
 Olga, Missouri, an unincorporated community
 Olga, Washington, an unincorporated community
 Olga Bay, Alaska, a bay on the south end of Kodiak Island
 Olga, a neighborhood of South Pasadena, California

Elsewhere
 Kata Tjuta, Northern Territory, Australia, also known as the Olgas, a group of domed rock formations
 Mount Olga, the tallest of these rock formations
 Olga, Greece, a settlement
 304 Olga, a main belt asteroid

Arts and entertainment
 Olga (opera), a 2006 Brazilian opera about Olga Benário Prestes
 Olga (2004 film), a 2004 Brazilian biopic of Benário
 Olga (2021 film), a Franco-Ukrainian-language Swiss drama
 Olga TV, a British independent television production company
 On-line Guitar Archive, a former online resource for guitar chords and tablature

Other uses
 OLGA (technology), an oil and gas simulator
 Tropical Storm Olga, the name of several tropical cyclones
 , a German coaster in service 1927–59
 Olga (horse), an equine recipient of the Dickin Medal
 Führerhauptquartier Olga, an unfinished German World War II bunker facility planned for Hitler's use near Orsha, Soviet Union

See also 
 Oga (disambiguation)